Anthemiphylliidae is a family of corals belonging to the order Scleractinia.

Genera:
 Anthemiphyllia Pourtalès, 1878

References

Scleractinia
Cnidarian families